"Give Me a Little More Time" is a song by English singer and songwriter Gabrielle, recorded for her second studio album, Gabrielle (1996). Written by Gabrielle and Ben Barson with the Boilerhouse Boys, Ben Wolff, and Andrew Dean, it served as the album's lead single. "Give Me a Little More Time" returned Gabrielle to the top 10 of the UK Singles Chart, peaking at number five and spending 10 weeks inside the top 20. The song also peaked at number nine on the Irish Singles Chart and reached the top 40 in Iceland, the Netherlands, New Zealand, and Sweden.

Critical reception
Larry Flick from Billboard wrote, "Miles above "Dreams" in song quality, this Go! Beat single shows Gabrielle in more flexible voice. The woman has clearly been working overtime on expanding her range and developing a unique approach to phrasing—and it shows. She's still got the street in her, to be sure, but this jam could easily broaden her reach beyond kids in the clubs and on the corner. The album mix surrounds her in Motown-styled echo, horns, and handclaps, with playful results." 

Alan Jones from British magazine Music Week commented, "Gabrielle has been away for some time and may have lost a little impetus but she certainly hasn't lost her talent, as her new single Give Me A Little More Time amply demonstrates. She sings like an angel against a slowed-down Sixties Stax-style backing, with punchy brass and silky strings underpinning her charismatic vocals." Daisy & Havoc from the RM Dance Update rated the song five out of five, adding, "Gabrielle is back singing soul again, and old soul at that. She does it beautifully on the Album mix, which hums with some very old school atmosphere."

Track listings

Charts and sales

Weekly charts

Year-end charts

Certifications and sales

Release history

References

1995 songs
1996 singles
Gabrielle (singer) songs
Go! Beat singles
London Records singles
Songs written by Gabrielle (singer)